Letsgomoose is a proposed commuter rail system for the Ottawa Capital Region and beyond. The driving force is the Moose Consortium Inc. consisting of currently 10 businesses. It is intended not to rely on public subsidies but on a model called "Property-Powered Railway Open Market Development". A key stone will be the Prince of Wales Bridge which connects Ottawa with its neighbouring city, Gatineau, Quebec.

History 
There have been some early studies in 2007 outlining for estimated seven million dollars a possible rail link from Alexandria.

See also 
 Hull–Chelsea–Wakefield Railway

References

External links 
 

Passenger railways in Ontario